Venus in Evening Wear (German: Venus im Frack) is a 1927 German silent film directed by Robert Land and starring Carmen Boni, Georg Alexander and Henri De Vries.

The art direction was by Oscar Friedrich Werndorff and Erich Zander.

Cast
 Carmen Boni
and in alphabetical order
 Georg Alexander 
 Henri De Vries
 Karl Elzer 
 Evi Eva 
 Max Hansen 
 Karl Harbacher 
 Valerie Jones 
 Paul Morgan 
 Hermann Picha 
 Albert Steinrück 
 Robert Thiem]
 Borwin Walth 
 Ida Wüst 
 Wolfgang Zilzer

References

Bibliography
 Grange, William. Cultural Chronicle of the Weimar Republic. Scarecrow Press, 2008.

External links

1927 films
Films of the Weimar Republic
Films directed by Robert Land
German silent feature films
German black-and-white films